Elongase is a generic term for an enzyme that catalyzes carbon chain extension of an organic molecule, especially a fatty acid. Elongases play a variety of roles in mammalian organisms, accounting for changes in tissue function, lipid regulation, and the overall physiology of an organism.

List of Elongases
 Very-long-chain (3R)-3-hydroxyacyl-(acyl-carrier protein) dehydratase
 Icosanoyl-CoA synthase

References

Enzymes